Heterotheca sessiliflora is a species of flowering plant in the family Asteraceae known by the common name sessileflower false goldenaster. It is native to California, Sonora, and Baja California.

Heterotheca sessiliflora grows in many types of habitats. It is a perennial herb which is quite variable in appearance, particularly across its four subspecies. It may be a small clumping or mat-forming plant or grow tall stems to heights exceeding a meter. It is coated in small bristles or long woolly hairs and it is glandular, particularly around the inflorescence. The flower head contains long yellowish disc florets and the edge is fringed with yellow ray florets.

Subspecies + varieties
Heterotheca sessiliflora subsp. bolanderi (A.Gray) Semple San Francisco Bay area + coast of Redwood Country
Heterotheca sessiliflora subsp. echioides (Benth.) Semple - from San Diego County to Sonoma County
Heterotheca sessiliflora subsp. fastigiata (Greene) Semple  - mountains of southern California
Heterotheca sessiliflora var. sessiliflora
Heterotheca sessiliflora subsp. sessiliflora - from Baja California north as far as Santa Clara County
Heterotheca sessiliflora var. thiniicola (Rzed. & C.Ezcurra) G.L.Nesom - Gran Desierto de Alta northwestern Sonora

References

External links
Jepson Manual Treatment
United States Department of Agriculture Plants Profile
Calphotos Photo gallery, University of California
Photo of herbarium specimen at Missouri Botanical Garden, collected in Santa Barbara County in 1902, isotype of Chrysopsis californica

Flora of California
Flora of Baja California
Flora of Sonora
Plants described in 1840
sessiliflora